Barry Michael (born 2 June 1955) is an Australian former boxer. He was in his prime during the 1980s and is best remembered for his 1985 fight against Lester Ellis, which received nationwide television coverage in Australia.

Early life
Michael was born on 2 June 1955 in England and his family migrated to Australia in 1957. He grew up in Williamstown and dropped his surname Swettenham.

Professional career
Michael won the IBF super featherweight title on 12 July 1985 over Lester Ellis. He made his first defense three months later on 19 October 1985 with a 4th-round TKO win over Korean Jin-Shik Choi at the Darwin Oval in the Northern Territory. The 25-year-old Choi had a record of 17-1 (15) going into the fight and had won eight straight. Jin-Shik Choi's only loss going into the fight was to Rod Sequenan (Ellis' first defense), two years earlier by 12th-round knockout.

Later career
Michael ran for the Senate in 2013, representing the Palmer United Party.

Today, Michael is a boxing analyst in the media and appears on SEN 1116 as well as writing for the Herald Sun.

References

External links
 Crunch! ... punch from Barry Michael ..., 1985 / Bruce Howard
https://web.archive.org/web/20060627150314/http://anbhof.com/barrymichaels.html Australian National Boxing Hall Of Fame
 

1955 births
Living people
Sportspeople from Watford
English emigrants to Australia
International Boxing Federation champions
United Australia Party (2013) politicians
Australian male boxers
Commonwealth Boxing Council champions
Super-featherweight boxers
Boxers from Melbourne
People from Williamstown, Victoria